David Satz may refer to:

David M. Satz, Jr., U.S. Attorney for the District of New Jersey from 1961 to 1969 
David Satz (musician), American musician and recording engineer, winner of 1996 Grammy for Best Historical Album, see 38th Annual Grammy Awards